Old Norvicensians (ONs) are former pupils of Norwich School, an independent co-educational day public school in Norwich, England. It was founded in 1096 as an episcopal school by the first Bishop of Norwich, Herbert de Losinga, and is one of the longest surviving schools in the United Kingdom. It was refounded by royal charter in 1547 by Edward VI. ONs may join the Old Norvicensian Club of former pupils. Predecessors include the Parrian Club, a dining society for former pupils of Samuel Parr's headship in the late 18th century, and the Valpeian Club, after Edward Valpy in the early 19th century. In 1866, the latter gave way to the Norwich School Club, which became the current association for former pupils at the beginning of the 20th century.

Academia

 Christopher Andrew, historian
 William Lawrence Balls FRS, botanist
 Reyner Banham, architectural historian
 Robert Blake, Baron Blake, historian and life peer
 Henry Bond, physician and Regius Professor of Physic, Cambridge University
 William Briggs, physician and oculist
 Edward Browne FRS, physician and president of the Royal College of Physicians
 Sir Edward Bullard FRS, geophysicist
 John Caius, founder of Gonville and Caius College, Cambridge
 E. W. W. Carlier, histologist
 Professor Dr Tom Cavalier-Smith, FRS, FRSC, FRSA, FIBiol, evolutionary biologist 
 Samuel Clarke FRS, philosopher
 Sydney Copeman FRS, medical scientist responsible for improvements in the smallpox vaccination
 William Dalrymple, surgeon noted for the successful tying the carotid artery
 Martin Davy FRS, Master of Caius College, Cambridge
 Joe Farman CBE, geophysicist, co-discover of the Antarctic ozone hole
 Sir William Jackson Hooker FRS, botanist and Director of the Royal Botanic Gardens, Kew
 Sir Owen Wansbrough-Jones, chemist and scientific adviser to government
 Mark A. Lemmon FRS, biochemist, biophysicist, and cancer biologist at Yale University
 John Lindley FRS, botanist, gardener and orchidologist
 Roger Long FRS, astronomer
 James MacKeith OBE, forensic psychiatrist who played a major part in the successful appeals of the Guildford Four and Birmingham Six
 John Quelch, professor at Harvard Business School
 Oliver Rackham OBE, botanist and an authority on the British countryside
 Edward Rigby, physician
 John Smith, astronomer
 Sir Richard V. Southwell FRS, aeronautical engineer and rector of Imperial College London
 Alfred Stephenson OBE, polar surveyor and explorer
 Benjamin Stillingfleet, botanist and writer
 Henry Wild, orientalist
 Henry Woodward FRS, geologist

Artists
Several members of the Norwich School of painters were educated at Norwich School and taught by John Crome when he was drawing master.
 John Sell Cotman, leading member of the Norwich School of painters
 John Berney Crome, member of the Norwich School of painters, son of John Crome
 Edward Thomas Daniell, member of the Norwich School of painters
 Hugh Welch Diamond, photographer
 Frederick Sandys, Pre-Raphaelite painter
 Edward Seago, Post-Impressionist painter
 James Stark, member of the Norwich School of painters
 George Vincent, member of the Norwich School of painters

Athletes

 Tom Adeyemi, footballer
 Emma Pooley, Olympic cyclist
 Clive Radley MBE, cricketer and former head coach of MCC
Stuart Cowie, professional squash player
 Geoffrey Stevens, cricketer
 Freddie Steward, rugby union player
 Cameron Tasker, rower

Business
 Steffan Aquarone, entrepreneur and film producer
 Peter Kindersley, chairman of the publishing company Dorling Kindersley (DK) and Bafta award winner
 Sir John Quinton, chairman of Barclays Bank and the first chairman of the FA Premier League
 Richard Twining FRS (1772–1857), tea merchant and chairman of the committee of by-laws at East India House

Clergy

 Thomas Ainger, clergyman
 Theophilus Brabourne, clergyman and writer
 Nicholas Clagett the Younger, controversialist
 John Clarke, Dean of Salisbury and mathematician 
 John Cosin, Bishop of Durham
 Richard Charles Coxe, canon of Durham
 Richard Fletcher, Bishop of Worcester (1593–1594) and Bishop of London (1595–1596)
 Thomas Green, Bishop of Ely and Norwich, vice-chancellor of Cambridge University
 John Groome, clergyman
 Robert Hindes Groome, archdeacon of Suffolk
 Thomas Gumble, clergyman and biographer
 Henry Kett, clergyman and scholar
 Edward Maltby FRS, Bishop of Durham
 James Henry Monk, Bishop of Gloucester and Bristol and classical scholar
 James Martineau, Unitarian philosopher
 Charles Moss FRS, Bishop of St David's and Bishop of Bath and Wells
 Robert Moss, Dean of Ely
 Dudley Narborough, Bishop of Colchester
 John Perowne, Bishop of Worcester
 William Purcell, Archdeacon of Dorking
 John Gooch Robberds, Unitarian minister
 John Stoughton, Congregational minister
 Thomas Tenison, Archbishop of Canterbury 1694 to 1715
 Edward Walpole, Jesuit preacher
 Henry Walpole, Jesuit martyr, one of the Forty Martyrs of England and Wales
 Michael Walpole, Jesuit
 Cecil Wilfred Wilson, Bishop of Middleton

Law

 Sir Richard Aikens, Lord Justice of Appeal
 Sir Henry Bedingfield, Chief Justice of the Common Pleas
 Sir Edward Coke, Elizabethan and Jacobean jurist, judge, and politician
 Erasmus Earle, serjeant-at-law to Oliver Cromwell
 Sir Forrest Fulton, Conservative MP, Common Serjeant, and Recorder of London
 Sir Thomas Richardson, Speaker of the House of Commons, later Chief Justice of the Common Pleas and Chief Justice of the King's Bench
 Sir Edward Stracey, Counsel to the Chairman of the Lords Committees
 Lord Wilberforce, law lord
 Sir Ernest Wild, judge and Conservative MP

Literature

 Robert Baron, poet and playwright
 George Borrow, author
 John Brereton, chronicler
 Edward Forster FRS, writer
 Robert Greene, poet, novelist and critic of Shakespeare
 Henry Kett, educator and writer
 Henry William Massingham, journalist and editor of The Nation
 Thomas Monro, writer
 Richard K. Morgan, acclaimed author of science fiction and fantasy novels 
 Thomas Starling Norgate, writer, journalist and newspaper editor
 Henry Reeve, journalist and translator of Alexis de Tocqueville's Democracy in America
 D. J. Taylor, critic, novelist and biographer

Media

 Leslie Cheung, Hong Kong singer-songwriter and actor
 Simon Cook, actor and politician
 Becky Mantin, model and television presenter
 Paul Spurrier, actor
 Tim Westwood, BBC Radio 1 DJ 1994 to 2013

Military

 Major Alexis Charles Doxat VC
 Sir Vincent Eyre, army officer in the East India Company
 Philip F. Fullard, First World War flying ace
 Horatio Nelson, 1st Viscount Nelson
 Lt Col Derek Seagrim VC
 Major Hugh Seagrim GC
 Major General Greg Smith, Assistant Chief of the Defence Staff (Reserves and Cadets)
 Col John Manners Smith VC
 Lt Col Charles Stoddart, army officer and diplomat 
 Sir Archdale Wilson, commander in the Siege of Delhi

Politicians and civil servants

 Michael Ashcroft, Baron Ashcroft, former Deputy Chairman of the Conservative Party
 Sir Jacob Astley, 1st Baronet, High Sheriff of Norfolk and Conservative MP
 Sir James Brooke, Rajah of Sarawak
 Richard Harman, MP for Norwich in the Long Parliament
 John Ives FRS, antiquarian and officer of arms
 Christopher Layer, Jacobite conspirator
 Charles Marsh, MP and barrister
 Sir Robert Naunton, MP and Secretary of State
 Arthur Samuel, 1st Baron Mancroft, Conservative politician
 Sir Oliver St John, chief commissioner of Baluchistan
 Sir Graham Savage, educational administrator
 John Virgoe, British High Commissioner to Brunei
 Arthur Christopher Watson, British High Commissioner to Brunei

Miscellaneous
 Vernon William Blythe, stage name Vernon Castle, ballroom dancer
 Kit Downes, jazz pianist
 Peter le Neve Foster, secretary to the Royal Society of Arts
 Humphry Repton, landscape gardener
 George H. Widdows, architect of over 70 schools in Derbyshire
 William Wilkins FRS, Greek Revivalist architect of the National Gallery among others

Wrongly identified as alumni
 Matthew Parker, Archbishop of Canterbury 1559 to 1575 is incorrectly identified in Bayne's A Comprehensive History of Norwich (1869) as attending the school. The confusion may have arisen out of Parker's role as a benefactor of a number of scholarships at Corpus Christi College, Cambridge to the school and the city of Norwich.

References

Bibliography

External links
Norwich School website

Norvicensians
Norvice